The Italy national equestrian team represents Italy in International Equestrian competitions such as Olympic Games or World Equestrian Championships.

History
The national Italian Equestrian team participated to all the Summer Olympics editions, from Paris 1900, 21 times on 23.

Medal tables

Olympic Games
Since the 1980 Summer Olympics in Moscow, the Italian national equestrian team has not won a medal in the Olympic Games.

Multiple medalists

Olympic Games
Sorted by individual gold medals.

See also
Italy at the Olympics
Equestrian Summer Olympics medal table
World Equestrian Games medal table

References

External links
Italy Equestrian at Summer Olympics
 Federazione Italiana Sport Equestri

Equestrian
Equestrian sports in Italy